Tomasz Stańczyk (born 5 November 1978) is a Polish sailor. He competed at the 2000 Summer Olympics and the 2004 Summer Olympics.

References

External links
 

1978 births
Living people
Polish male sailors (sport)
Olympic sailors of Poland
Sailors at the 2000 Summer Olympics – 470
Sailors at the 2004 Summer Olympics – 470
People from Mrągowo